The vigilante film is a film genre in which the protagonist or protagonists engage in vigilante behavior, taking the law into their own hands. Vigilante films are usually revenge films in which the legal system fails protagonists, leading them to become vigilantes. The vigilante film has in recent years often crossed over with the Superhero genre, due to character origin stories frequently involving an injustice having been committed against them.

History

In United States cinema, vigilante films gained prominence during the 1970s with "touchstones" like Death Wish and Dirty Harry, both of which received multiple sequels. The 1974 film Death Wish has been described as officially starting the genre, causing many cheap imitations and knockoffs such as Vigilante and Vigilante Force, with the most financially successful being 1980's The Exterminator.

The Los Angeles Times reported, "Vigilante vengeance was the cinematic theme of the decade, flourishing in the more respectable precincts of the new American cinema even as it fueled numerous exploitation flicks," referring to Taxi Driver as a respectable example of the genre. It reported in 2009 that such films were making a comeback after "the comparatively prosperous and peaceable 1990s", with examples like Walking Tall (2004), Death Sentence (2007) and Law Abiding Citizen (2009).

List of films

Pre-1965 vigilante films

Late 60s-mid 80s vigilante film wave

Late 1980s to the present

See also
Poliziotteschi
Crime drama
Psychological thriller
Rape and revenge film
Horror film

References

Bibliography

Film genres
 
1960s in film
1970s in film
1980s in film